|-
| Čaić 
| Livno
| Canton 10
|-
| Čakići 
| Novi Travnik
| Central Bosnia Canton
|-
| Čalići
| 
|
|-
| Čapljina 
| Čapljina
| Herzegovina-Neretva Canton
|-
| Čaprazlije 
| Livno
| Canton 10
|-
| Čardaci 
| Bugojno
| Central Bosnia Canton
|-
| Čaušlije 
| Bugojno
| Central Bosnia Canton
|-
| Čavaš 
| Ravno
| Herzegovina-Neretva Canton
|-
| Čavići 
| Bugojno
| Central Bosnia Canton
|-
| Čehari
| 
|
|-
| Čehova 
| Novi Travnik
| Central Bosnia Canton
|-
| Čelebić 
| Livno
| Canton 10
|-
| Čelebići
| Konjic
| Herzegovina-Neretva Canton
|-
| Čelina
| Konjic
| Herzegovina-Neretva Canton
|-
| Čeljevo
| Čapljina
|
|-
| Čerigaj 
| Široki Brijeg
|
|-
| Čerin
| Čitluk
|
|-
| Čičevo
| 
|
|-
| Čifluk 
| Travnik
| Central Bosnia Canton
|-
| Čitluk
| Čitluk
|
|-
| Čitluk
| Goražde
|
|-
| Čitluk
| Posušje
|
|-
| Čivelj
| 
|
|-
| Čopice 
| Ravno
| Herzegovina-Neretva Canton
|-
| Čosići 
| Travnik
| Central Bosnia Canton
|-
| Čovčići
| 
|
|-
| Čuhovići
| 
|
|-
| Čukle 
| Travnik
| Central Bosnia Canton
|-
| Čuklić 
| Livno
| Canton 10
|-
| Čurovi
| 
|
|-
| Čvaljina 
| Ravno
| Herzegovina-Neretva Canton
|}

Lists of settlements in the Federation of Bosnia and Herzegovina (A-Ž)